Wuhua District is one of seven districts of the prefecture-level city of Kunming, the capital of Yunnan Province, Southwest China.

History

Administrative divisions
Huguo, Huashan, Daguan, Longxiang, Lianhua, Fengning, Hongyun, Helinpu and Puji Sub-district Offices, Shalang Bai Nationality Village and Changkou Village.

References 

 Area Code and Postal Code in Yunnan Province

External links 
Wuhua District Official Website
Information about Wuhua District

County-level divisions of Kunming